Glendora High School (GHS) is located in Glendora, Los Angeles County, California, United States.

History
The high school was built in 1958 on land owned by Clarks Gordan, an orange grower. Before it was built, Glendora students attended Citrus College which functioned as both a high school and junior college for the area. The land contained oak trees which still grow on the school grounds. The first graduating class of GHS was in 1959 and contained 188 students. The school's teams are known as the Glendora Tartans. This name was chosen by the first class in a vote between "Tartans" and "The Oranges".

Activities
The school is notable for being one of six schools in California to have a bagpipe squad in its band program. The school's Tartan Band and Pageantry participated in the Tournament of Roses Parade in 2010 and 2014, in Pasadena, California.

Athletics
Glendora is a member of the Palomares League of the CIF Southern Section. The school's cross-country team achieved the CIF-SS Division II championship in 2009 and finished second at the CIF-State Division II Championships meet. The cross-country team was also in the CIF-State Division II Championship meet in 2011, placing 11th. The baseball program has achieved much success and captured a CIF-SS Division II championship in 2010. The girls' swim team has had success at the CIF level, winning the Division II Championship in 2011 and 2014, and placing second in 2010 and 2015. It has also entered CIF Masters in Cross Country 2016. The school's basketball team won the CIF-SS Division III championship in 2021.

Awards
Glendora High School is a California Distinguished School, meaning it has a high API, which measures student academic performance.

Notable alumni

 Casey Ellison, actor, Punky Brewster
 Lea Antonoplis, tennis player
 Tamra Barney, cast member, Real Housewives of Orange County
 Brian Cooper, former professional baseball player (Anaheim Angels, Toronto Blue Jays, San Francisco Giants)
 Collin Delia, professional ice hockey player (Chicago Blackhawks)
 Chuck Detwiler, American football player
 Jacob Gonzalez, 2022 College World Series champion shortstop at the University of Mississippi (Ole Miss) and 2023 MLB draft prospect
 Casey Jacobsen, basketball player
 Ed Kirkpatrick, former professional baseball player (California Angels, Kansas City Royals, Pittsburgh Pirates, Texas Rangers, Milwaukee Brewers)
 Gabrial McNair, musician
 David Milhous (Brazzel), Emmy Award-winning film and television editor
 Mike Misuraca, former professional baseball player (Milwaukee Brewers)
 Tracy Murray, UCLA basketball player, former professional basketball player
 Anna Nalick, singer-songwriter
 Phil Ouellette, former professional baseball player (San Francisco Giants)
 Ed Pierce, former professional baseball player (Kansas City Royals)
 Adam Plutko, UCLA baseball player, CWS Most Outstanding Player
 Tony Robbins, motivational speaker
 Aaron Rowand, former professional baseball player (Chicago White Sox, Philadelphia Phillies, San Francisco Giants)
 Jonathan Smith, head football coach at Oregon State University

References

External links

 Final Day at GHS: June 1999

High schools in Los Angeles County, California
Public high schools in California
Glendora, California
1958 establishments in California
Educational institutions established in 1958